Böle may refer to:

 Böle (Piteå Municipality), a locality in Piteå Municipality, Norrbotten County, Sweden
 the Swedish name of Pasila, in Helsinki, Finland
 A village of Siuntio, Finland

See also
 Bole (disambiguation)